Artuch (Russian and Tajik: Артуч) is a village in Sughd Region, northern Tajikistan. It is part of the jamoat Rudaki in the city of Panjakent. It is not far from the Kulikalon Lakes.
W-01.jpg

References

Populated places in Sughd Region